Sobell is a surname. Notable people with the surname include:

 Helen Levitov Sobell (1918–2002), American teacher, scientist, and activist
 Linda C. Sobell, professor of clinical psychology
 Mark B. Sobell, professor and specialist in addiction
 Michael Sobell (1892–1993), British businessman
 Morton Sobell (1917–2018), American engineer, convicted of espionage in 1951
 Nina Sobell (born 1947), American artist

See also

 Sobel (disambiguation)